Dicobalt silicide (Co2Si) is an intermetallic compound, a silicide of cobalt.

References

Cobalt compounds
Transition metal silicides